Platonov is a rural locality (a khutor) in Perekopskoye Rural Settlement, Kletsky District, Volgograd Oblast, Russia. The population was 11 as of 2010. There are 2 streets.

Geography 
Platonov is located in steppe, on the Kurtlak River, 21 km south of Kletskaya (the district's administrative centre) by road. Selivanov is the nearest rural locality.

References 

Rural localities in Kletsky District